Charles Francis Topham de Vere Beauclerk (born 22 February 1965), also styled Earl of Burford by courtesy, is a British aristocrat and heir to the peerage title of Duke of St Albans.

Beauclerk first came to public attention when he attempted to interfere with a debate in the House of Lords, declaring a Bill which would exclude hereditary peers from the House to be treasonable.

A writer and exponent of the Oxfordian theory of Shakespeare authorship, after the House of Lords Act 1999, he refuses to be known by his courtesy title, believing it to be worthless insofar as most hereditary peers were removed from parliament (albeit 90 may still be elected to sit in the House of Lords).

Early life
Lord Burford is the eldest son and heir apparent of Murray Beauclerk, 14th Duke of St Albans, and is descended from Charles Beauclerk, 1st Duke of St Albans, the illegitimate son of Charles II and Nell Gwyn.

He was educated at Eton College and Sherborne School before going up to Hertford College, Oxford.

Politics
Beauclerk first came to wide public attention during a debate on the House of Lords Act 1999 concerning the amendment of voting rights for hereditary peers. After listening to the debate while seated on the first step of the Throne, as was his right as the eldest son of a peer, Beauclerk leapt to his feet, crossed the floor of the House, stood on the Woolsack (the Speaker's chair in the House of Lords) and declared the bill treason to the life and culture of Britain, insisting that hereditary peers should retain their right to sit and vote in the House. He said, "This bill, drafted in Brussels, is treason. What we are witnessing is the abolition of Britain... Before us lies the wasteland... No Queen, no culture, no sovereignty, no freedom. Stand up for your Queen and country and vote this bill down."

His actions led to criticism from Labour Party MPs. Angela Smith said it was the "tantrum of a naughty child", adding that "While claiming to defend tradition, he clearly showed no respect for it; while decrying the will of the elected House to be 'treason', he showed no respect for democracy."

On 14 May 2016 Lord Burford was the guest-of-honour at the Annual Dinner of the ultra-conservative Traditional Britain Group where he received a standing ovation.

Election candidate
Subsequently, as Charles Beauclerk he stood as the first ever candidate for the Democratic Party at the 1999 Kensington and Chelsea by-election. Kensington and Chelsea was perceived as a very safe seat for the Conservatives. Beauclerk's campaign manager John Gouriet, head of the group Freedom in Action, said that "Lord Burford feels very strongly as a true patriot that the Conservative Party has failed completely to stop the revolutionary march of socialism in the last few months." The seat was won, as expected, by the Conservative candidate Michael Portillo. Beauclerk received 189 votes (0.9%).

Oxfordian theory and writings
Through his father he is related to Edward de Vere, 17th Earl of Oxford (hence the double surname), and has played a prominent role in promoting the Oxfordian theory that Oxford wrote the works of William Shakespeare. He also claims that Oxford was the real author of works attributed to other Elizabethan writers, including John Lyly, George Gascoigne and Thomas Watson. Beauclerk regularly lectures on Oxfordian subjects in the United States.

Books
In 2010 he published Shakespeare's Lost Kingdom: The True History of Shakespeare and Elizabeth, in which he espouses a version of "Prince Tudor theory" which holds that Oxford was the lover of Queen Elizabeth I, and that Henry Wriothesley, 3rd Earl of Southampton was in fact their son. Beauclerk supports the most radical version of the theory, which adds the claim that Oxford himself was the Queen's son, and thus the father of his own half-brother, having fathered him with his own mother.

Beauclerk has also written a biography of his ancestor Nell Gwyn (Macmillan, 2005), which was the inspiration for the 2016 West End hit of the same name starring Gemma Arterton. Piano Man, his life of John Ogdon (Simon & Schuster, 2014), was shortlisted for the Spear Book Awards biography prize, and was described by Jeremy Nicholas in his review for Gramophone as "Perhaps the most riveting, intimate and revealing biography of a musician I have read."

In 1999 Beauclerk was employed as literary secretary for Nicholas Hagger in which capacity he made a selection of Hagger's poems. However following his dramatic exploits leaping onto the woolsack that year, he left Hagger's employ and the selection of 92 poems remained undisturbed for nearly twenty years. When Hagger rediscovered the collection, called Visions of England, he decided to publish them as he considered the collection provided a prophetic anticipation of a spirit of independence born out by Brexit.

Personal life
On 29 December 1994, at Manaton, Dartmoor, Beauclerk was married to Canadian actress and pop singer Louise Anne Beatrice Fiona Robey. From that marriage he has one son: 
 James Malcolm Aubrey Edward de Vere Beauclerk, Lord Vere of Hanworth (born 2 August 1995). Following their divorce in 2001, they shared custody of their son.

Beauclerk married Sarah Davenport, who is an artist and designer, at Bestwood Lodge, Nottingham in June 2017.

Charles Beauclerk is a Vice-President of the Royal Stuart Society, of which his father, the 14th Duke of St Albans, is presently the Governor-General (since 1989) and his grandfather, the 13th Duke, held this office between 1976 and 1988.

See also
Baroness Vere of Norbiton

References

External links
Shakespeare’s Lost Kingdom: The True History of Shakespeare and Elizabeth, Book Review by Michael Delahoyde, Brief Chronicles, Vol. II (2010), pp. 237–243.
Shakespeare’s Lost Kingdom: The True History of Shakespeare and Elizabeth, Book Review by Christopher Paul, Brief Chronicles, Vol. II (2010), pp. 244–257.

Further reading
The House of Nell Gwyn: the fortunes of the Beauclerk family, 1670-1974 (Donald Adamson & Peter Beauclerk Dewar)

1965 births
Living people
People educated at Eton College
People educated at Sherborne School
Alumni of Hertford College, Oxford
Courtesy earls
C
Oxfordian theory of Shakespeare authorship
Shakespeare authorship theorists